Znamenka is a rural locality (a village) in Malyshevskoye Rural Settlement, Selivanovsky District, Vladimir Oblast, Russia. The population was 12 as of 2010.

Geography 
Znamenka is located 12 km southwest of Krasnaya Gorbatka (the district's administrative centre) by road. Belkovo is the nearest rural locality.

References 

Rural localities in Selivanovsky District